Jean-Paul Bonatou (born 15 September 1966) is a Cameroonian boxer. He competed in the men's lightweight event at the 1988 Summer Olympics.

References

1966 births
Living people
Cameroonian male boxers
Olympic boxers of Cameroon
Boxers at the 1988 Summer Olympics
Sportspeople from Douala
Lightweight boxers
20th-century Cameroonian people